Fabio Schneider (born 31 July 2002) is a German professional footballer who plays as a midfielder for Regionalliga Nordost club Greifswalder FC.

Career
Schneider started his career with Bundesliga side Union Berlin. He was included in Union's 2021–22 Conference League squad, but remained on the bench in all games and was not called up for any Bundesliga or cup games.

Before the 2022 season, he was sent on loan to KuPS in Finland. On 29 January 2022, he debuted for KuPS during a 3–1 win over VPS in the Finnish League Cup. He suffered an injury on his KuPS II debut and did not play for the remainder of his loan term.

On 5 January 2023, Schneider signed with Greifswalder FC.

References

External links
 
 

2002 births
Living people
German footballers
Footballers from Berlin
Association football midfielders
Kakkonen players
Regionalliga players
1. FC Union Berlin players
Kuopion Palloseura players
German expatriate footballers
German expatriate sportspeople in Finland
Expatriate footballers in Finland